Bilbo can refer to:

Bilbo Baggins, protagonist of The Hobbit by J. R. R. Tolkien
Bilbo, the Basque name for Bilbao, the major city in the Basque Country of northern Spain
Bilboes, iron restraints placed on a person's ankles or wrists
Bilbo (sword), a type of sword thought to be named after the Spanish city
Bilbo (band), Scottish band

People
Damarius Bilbo (born 1982), American football player
Jack Bilbo (1907–1967), European writer, art gallery owner, and artist
Theodore G. Bilbo (1877–1947), white supremacist Governor of and Senator from Mississippi
William Bilbo (ca. 1815–1877), attorney, journalist, and entrepreneur who lobbied for passage of the Thirteenth Amendment to the United States Constitution
Nickname of Robert Walker (musician) (born 1937), blues musician
Nickname of Ernest Berger, drummer for Heatwave (band)

Other
2991 Bilbo, an asteroid
Bilbo, the UK's first fully qualified canine lifeguard or 'lifedog'
Bilbo, the name Fionn Regan used for an early album
BILBO (Birth before 29 weeks: interventions leading to better outcomes for mothers and babies), a project of the Canadian Perinatal Network